José Eduardo López Rodríguez (born 20 December 1990) is a Mexican professional boxer in the Light Welterweight division.

Professional career
On May 21, 2011 López upset prospect Jorge Páez, Jr. at the San Martín Texmelucan de Labastida in Puebla, Mexico.

References

External links

Boxers from Coahuila
Sportspeople from Torreón
Light-welterweight boxers
1990 births
Living people
Mexican male boxers